The LeapPad Explorer was the first release in a new line of LeapPad products after the discontinuation of the original LeapPad line by LeapFrog Enterprises, Inc. LeapPad Explorer was released on August 15, 2011.

New versions of the LeapPad Explorers were released in July 2012. The update was branded the LeapPad2 and has a higher resolution camera, longer battery life, 4 GB of memory and a LF 2000 processor.

LeapPad Explorer specs
 Built-in 1.2 megapixel camera/video recorder
 5" touch screen (480x272)
 2 GB of storage

LeapPad2 specs
 Built-in 2.0 megapixel camera/video recorder
 4 GB of storage
 LF 2000 processor (550 MHz)

Awards
In 2012, the LeapPad Explorer was awarded 3 titles: "Toy of the Year (overall)", "Educational Toy of the Year" and "Preschool Toy of the Year" at the 12th Annual Toy of the Year Awards, which is held at the American International Toy Fair in New York City.

See also
 LeapFrog Epic, an Android-based tablet computer developed and marketed by LeapFrog

References

List of games licensed
Adventure Sketchers
Barbie
Blaze and the Monster Machines
Brave
Ben 10: Ultimate Alien
Bubble Guppies
Cars 2
Clifford the Big Red Dog
Crayola Art Adventure
Digging for Dinosaurs
Disney/Pixar Up
Disney Princess
Disney The Princess and the Frog
Doc McStuffins
Doodle Jump
Dora the Explorer: Dora’s Worldwide Rescue
Finding Dory
Frozen
The Good Dinosaur
Get Puzzled!
Globe: Earth Adventure
Hot Wheels
 Hello Kitty: Sweet Little Shops
I Spy
Jake and the Never Land Pirates
Jewel Train
Kidz Bop
LeapSchool Math
LeapSchool Reading
Letter Factory
Letter Factory Adventures: The Rainforest
The Little Mermaid
The Magic School Bus (Oceans, Dinosaurs, & Dino Shuffle)
Mini–Game Greatest Hits
Minnie Mouse Bowtique
Monsters University
Moshi Monsters
Mr. Pencil Saves Doodleburg
My Little Pony: Friendship is Magic
NFL Rush Zone
Ni Hao, Kai-Lan: Super Happy Day!
Octonauts
 Olivia
PAW Patrol
Pet Pals 2: Best of Friends
The Penguins Of Madagascar: Operation Plushy Rescue
Phineas and Ferb
Pixar Pals
Planes
Pocoyo
Scooby-Doo (Pirate Ghost of the Barbary Coast)
Sesame Street
SpongeBob SquarePants (Fists of Foam & The Clam Prix)
Star Wars (Jedi Reading & The Clone Wars)
Tangled
Team Umizoomi
Teenage Mutant Ninja Turtles
Tinkerbell & Lost Treasure
Toy Story 3
Transformers: Rescue Bots (Race to the Rescue)
Turbo
Wallykazam!
 Wolverine and The X-Men

External links
 LeapPad Explorer

2011 introductions
ARM-based video game consoles
Children's educational video games
Educational toys
Electronic toys
Embedded Linux
Tablet computers
Linux-based video game consoles